Nacoleia inouei is a moth in the family Crambidae. It was described by Hiroshi Yamanaka in 1980. It is found in Japan and Korea.

Adults are on wing in August in Japan.

References

Moths described in 1980
Nacoleia
Moths of Japan
Moths of Korea